Ruda  is a village in the administrative district of Gmina Wieluń, within Wieluń County, Łódź Voivodeship, in central Poland.

The village has a population of 1,300.

Origin of the name
The name Ruda probably comes from rich iron ore deposits, which were mined in the Middle Ages using the dukel method in swampy meadows around the settlement. Iron forges still functioned in the 16th century.

History
It was discovered that the first human settlement in this area existed already in the Neolithic period (2,500-1700 years BC).

The defensive castellan stronghold, which has not been identified so far, was probably established at the turn of the 10th / 11th centuries. Ruda, at least from the first half of the 12th century, was the capital of the region. 

One of the oldest Polish castellans mentions in his chronicle Gall Anonim on the date of 1106, and immediately in connection with the residence of the princely court and the consecration of the church in it. Its existence is confirmed by the bull of Pope Innocent II from 1136, when it refers to the Ruthenian castellans. 

The parish church of St. Wojciech, according to tradition, funded by Piotr Dunin in 1142.

During the 13th century, Ruda was still one of the most important centers in Wielkopolska.

Its medieval development is due to its location on the Moravian-Kujawy route connecting Moravia with Pomerania, Gdańsk and Prussia and ensuring connection with the Opole and Małopolska Silesia. Already before 1264, the city was located here on German law, as evidenced by the mention of the mayor Fryderyk from 1264 and 1266.

Rudek's Chronicle and Jan Długosz also mention the urban character of Rudy. In the end, the attempt to develop the city center was not successful. During the reign of King Przemysł II, an administrative unit was defined as the Rudzka Land.

Already at the end of the thirteenth century, Ruda lost the role of economic and political center in favor of the Wieluń founded on a better, drier area. In the years 1419-20, the Archdiocese and the College of Canons were transferred to Wieluń. In this way, Ore became an ordinary village.

In the years 1975-1998, the town belonged administratively to the Sieradz Voivodship.

References

Villages in Wieluń County